Charge! is an American digital broadcast television network owned by the Sinclair Broadcast Group. The network features action- and adventure-based programming sourced primarily from the MGM television and film library.

The network is also available via a website stream for mobile devices (internet sourced) broadcast networks and via streaming service Stirr.

Background

Sinclair Broadcast Group had already put three digital broadcast television networks on the air. The first was with MGM, the science-fiction network Comet, which was launched in October 2015. American Sports Network, Sinclair's sports programming arm (now the framework for Stadium), was broadened to include full network operations on January 11, 2016. Sinclair started TBD, a network targeting millennial audiences, which commenced operations on February 13, 2017 in a soft launch.

History
Charge! was formally announced by Sinclair and MGM on January 17, 2017. The network debuted on February 28, 2017 at 10AM (ET) with an airing of the 1978 film Here Come the Tigers. Stations carrying The Works replaced the network with Charge.

As of 2020, along with sibling network Comet, Charge! is now owned-and-operated by Sinclair as MGM sold their operation stake in the two networks.

Programming
Charge! currently provides up to 18 hours of programming to its owned-and-operated and affiliated stations on weekdays from 9:00 a.m. to 3:00 a.m. Eastern Time and weekends from 12:00 p.m. to 3:00 a.m. Eastern Time. The remaining vacated hours are occupied by paid programming.

Programming on Charge! is sourced primarily from MGM's library of films and TV series, expressed by Sinclair's press release announcing the launch as "one of the deepest libraries of premium action-themed content in the world."  Titles indicated as airing on Charge! include the TV series In the Heat of the Night and The Magnificent Seven, the Rocky and James Bond film series, and other motion pictures including Platoon and Dances with Wolves. The channel has a similar demographic to rival networks Heroes & Icons and Start TV.

Ring of Honor Wrestling, the weekly professional wrestling television series produced by the Sinclair-affiliated promotion Ring of Honor, began airing on the network from July 9, 2017 to 2019. The series was previously syndicated to sibling broadcast network Comet.

On April 6, 2020, Charge! began airing Magnum, P.I. and Knight Rider  in addition to their line-up consisting of CHiPs and Walker, Texas Ranger. In the fall of 2020, Charge began airing Hunter, and CSI: Miami in June 2021. Walker, Texas Ranger would later be taken off the air due to a schedule change. Charge recently began airing The Commish and CSI: NY in early 2022.

Affiliates

At its outset, Sinclair slated the launch of Charge! to primarily take place on digital subchannels of stations it owns or operates. Other Sinclair stations will likely add Charge! during Spring 2017 (and also used it to replace Grit and Ion Mystery when their carriage agreements with Sinclair expired in January 2018), and Sinclair will continue to offer the network to stations outside its geographic footprint (the company projects Charge to reach over 50% of the U.S. by the end of 2nd quarter 2017). As of February 12, 2019, there are 56 affiliates of which 49 have the network on the air and 7 that have committed to broadcasting the network.

References

External links

Television networks in the United States
Classic television networks
Nostalgia television in the United States
Television channels and stations established in 2017
2017 establishments in the United States
Sinclair Broadcast Group